Studies in Natural Language Processing is the book series of the
Association for Computational Linguistics, published by
Cambridge University Press.
Steven Bird is the series editor.
The editorial board has the following members:
Chu-Ren Huang, Chair Professor of Applied Chinese Language Studies in the Department of Chinese and Bilingual Studies and the Dean of the Faculty of Humanities (The Hong Kong Polytechnic University),
Chris Manning, Associate Professor of Linguistics and Computer Science in the Department of Linguistics and Computer Science (Stanford University), 
Yuji Matsumoto, Professor of Computational Linguistics in Graduate School of Information Science (Nara Institute of Science and Technology), 
Maarten de Rijke, Professor of Information Processing and Internet in the Informatics Institute (the University of Amsterdam) and
Harold Somers, Professor of Language Engineering(Emeritus)in School of Computer Science (University of Manchester).

Books Currently in Print

Natural language processing